Shankar Pokhrel (born 1964) is the former Chief Minister of Lumbini Province. He was elected as the central secretary of Communist Party of Nepal (Unified Marxist–Leninist) from 1998 to 2008.

References

1964 births
Living people
People from Dang District, Nepal
Tribhuvan University alumni
Communist Party of Nepal (Unified Marxist–Leninist) politicians
Chief Ministers of Nepalese provinces
Members of the Provincial Assembly of Lumbini Province
Nepal MPs 1994–1999

Members of the 1st Nepalese Constituent Assembly